A recliner is an armchair or sofa that reclines when the occupant lowers the chair's back and raises its front. It has a backrest that can be tilted back, and often a footrest that may be extended by means of a lever on the side of the chair, or may extend automatically when the back is reclined.

A recliner is also known as a reclining chair, lounger and an armchair.

Modern recliners often feature an adjustable headrest, lumbar support and an independent footstool that adjusts with the weight and angle of the user's legs to maximize comfort. Additional features include heat, massage and vibration. Some models are wheelchair accessible.

Recliners can also accommodate a near supine position for sleeping (making them a multifunctional furniture), and are common in airplanes and trains, as well as in homes.

Etymology
The word recline was first used in the 1660s. Beginning in 1880, the word recliner was used to describe a type of chair.

History
Around 1850, the French introduced a reclining camp bed that could serve as a chair, a bed and a chaise longue. It was portable and featured padded arm rests and a steel frame. In the late 1800s, many designs were found for motion chairs that were made of wood with a padded seat and back. Designs from France and America included a document or book holder. The first reclining chair was reportedly owned by Napoleon III.

Knabush and Shoemaker, two American cousins, are credited with gaining a patent on a wooden recliner. The design was the same wooden bench recliner found in other designs. Issued in 1928, the patent led to the founding of La-Z-Boy. In 1930, Knabush and Shoemaker patented an upholstered model with a mechanical movement.

In 1959, Daniel F. Caldemeyer patented a recliner as owner of National Furniture Mfg. Co based in Evansville, Indiana. The design was based on the science of kinetics that he used while serving in the US Air Force. His design was used by NASA for the seats in Projects Mercury, Gemini and Apollo.

His chairs were used in the ready room for these missions and can be seen in the movie Apollo 13. The Secret Service bought 50 of them for President Lyndon Baines Johnson as a Christmas gift. A Life magazine photo of President Johnson, post gall bladder surgery, has the President lifting his shirt and showing his scar while sitting in one of these chairs. The Presidential Seal was embossed on these chairs with one currently in the Smithsonian Institution and another at the Lyndon Baines Johnson Library and Museum. With over 300 patents, Caldemeyer added the foot lift rest, heated seating and massage features to this chair and had the patent for the first entertainment center.

Variants

Recliners with casters 
Traditional home recliners are generally intended to be large immobile objects that never move and must be dragged or carried to be moved. Now home furniture manufacturers produce a thick padded leather or overstuffed fabric recliner with casters.

Recliners with casters are also designed for a medical setting such as for use in a nursing home or hospital. Medical recliners often have accessory hooks and an optional removable arm and tray table.

Wall hugger recliners 
Used for apartments, the wall hugger recliner is used to save space. A wall hugger recliner may be positioned with a few centimeters of clearance between itself and the wall and only reclines forward. This is achieved by utilizing a gliding mechanism underneath the seat that pushes the bottom half of the chair forward so the back of the recliner never gets any closer to the wall thus ensuring efficient usage of space.

Riser armchairs 
A riser armchair or lift chair includes a standing-up system, for elderly and people with limited mobility.

See also
Ergonomy
Massage chair
Sunlounger

References

Products introduced in 1928
 
Accessibility
Ergonomics